John Howell Collier (September 8, 1898 – April 21, 1980) was a lieutenant general in the United States Army. He was notable as a commander of 2nd Armored Division units in World War II and as the Army's Chief of Armor.

Early life
Nicknamed "Pee Wee" because of his diminutive  stature, Collier was born in Uvalde, Texas on September 8, 1898. He joined the Texas National Guard and served in the Villa Expedition.

Subsequent military career

Collier attended the United States Military Academy, from which he graduated in 1918. After receiving his commission, Collier was assigned to Europe to carry out an observation tour of World War I battlefields.

Assigned to the Cavalry branch, Collier completed the Cavalry Officer Basic Course in 1920.

Collier served in assignments throughout the United States, including instructor at New Mexico Military Institute and postings to Ft. Riley, Kansas, Ft. Benning, Georgia, and the Philippines.

Collier graduated from the Cavalry Regular Course in 1937, as well as the Advanced Equitation Course in 1938.

World War II

After graduating from the Command and General Staff College in 1941, Collier was assigned to the 2nd Armored Division for World War II. He served in Africa and Europe as commander of the division's 3rd Battalion 66th Armored Regiment, and succeeded to command of Combat Command A when Maurice Rose was assigned to command the 3rd Armored Division. He then commanded the 2nd Armored Division from June to September, 1945.

Post World War II
Collier continued his service after World War II, including high-profile assignments as the Army's Inspector of Armor, and commander of the U.S. Army Armor Center and School.

Korean War
After serving as the Chief of Armor, Collier assumed command of I Corps in Korea on July 13, 1954. In November he was assigned additional duty as interim deputy commander of the Eighth United States Army until the arrival of the permanent deputy commander, Lt. Gen. Claude B. Ferenbaugh, in early January 1955. Ferenbaugh retired at the end of June and Collier relinquished command of I Corps to become deputy commander of Eighth Army and U.S. Army Forces Far East. He promptly made nationwide headlines when he attempted to prevent U.S. service members from fraternizing with South Korean women, an effort that proved unsuccessful when commanders in areas outside Eighth Army control did not follow Collier's example.

Post Korean War
Collier returned to the United States in 1955 to assume command of the Fourth United States Army, where he served until his 1958 retirement.

Awards and decorations
General Collier's decorations included multiple awards of the Distinguished Service Medal, two awards of the Silver Star, and multiple awards of the Legion of Merit and Bronze Star.

Retirement and death
After his 1958 retirement, Collier resided in San Antonio, Texas, where he died on April 21, 1980. Collier was buried at Fort Sam Houston National Cemetery, Section M Site 105-C.

References

External links
Generals of World War II

1890s births
1980 deaths
United States Army Cavalry Branch personnel
United States Army personnel of the Korean War
United States Military Academy alumni
United States Army Command and General Staff College alumni
Recipients of the Distinguished Service Medal (US Army)
Recipients of the Silver Star
Recipients of the Legion of Merit
Military personnel from San Antonio
Burials at Fort Sam Houston National Cemetery
People from Uvalde, Texas
United States Army generals of World War II
United States Army generals